Diplodus prayensis, the two-banded seabream, is a species of marine fish of the family Sparidae. The species was first described by Jean Cadenat in 1964. The species name "prayensis" refers to Praia, the capital of Cape Verde.

Description
This species grows to an average length of 25 cm, maximum 35 cm. It feeds on invertebrates and seaweeds.

Distribution
The fish occurs in waters down to 100 metres depth. It occurs in the eastern Atlantic, off the coast of Cape Verde.

References

Further reading
 Eschmeyer, William N., ed. 1998. Catalog of Fishes. Special Publication of the Center for Biodiversity Research and Information, no. 1, vol. 1–3. California Academy of Sciences. San Francisco, California, USA. 2905. .
 Fenner, Robert M. The Conscientious Marine Aquarist. Neptune City, New Jersey, USA: T.F.H. Publications, 2001.
 Helfman, G., B. Collette and D. Facey: The diversity of fishes. Blackwell Science, Malden, Massachusetts, USA, 1997.
 Hoese, D.F. 1986. A M.M. Smith and P.C. Heemstra (eds.) Smiths' sea fishes. Springer-Verlag, Berlin, Germany
 Maugé, L.A. 1986. A J. Daget, J.-P. Gosse and D.F.E. Thys van den Audenaerde (eds.) Check-list of the freshwater fishes of Africa (CLOFFA). ISNB, Brussels; MRAC, Tervuren, Flanders; and ORSTOM, Paris, France, Vol. 2.
 Moyle, P. and J. Cech.: Fishes: An Introduction to Ichthyology, 4th ed., Upper Saddle River, New Jersey, USA: Prentice-Hall. 2000.
 Nelson, J.: Fishes of the World, 3rd ed.. New York, USA: John Wiley and Sons., 1994
 Wheeler, A.: The World Encyclopedia of Fishes, 2nd ed., London: Macdonald., 1985

prayensis
Endemic vertebrates of Cape Verde
Fauna of Cape Verde
Fish described in 1964
Taxa named by Jean Cadenat